The Astoria Column is a tower in the northwest United States, overlooking the mouth of the Columbia River on Coxcomb Hill in Astoria, Oregon. Built in 1926, the concrete and steel structure is part of a  city park. The -tall column has a 164-step spiral staircase ascending to an observation deck at the top and was added to the National Register of Historic Places on May 2, 1974.

History
The tower was built in 1926 with financing by the Great Northern Railway and Vincent Astor, the great-grandson of John Jacob Astor, in commemoration of the city's role in the family's business history. Patterned after the Trajan Column in Rome (and Place Vendôme Column in Paris), the Astoria Column was dedicated on July 22, 1926. Maintenance work was done in 1936. In 1974, the column was listed in the National Register of Historic Places. The murals that make up the column were refurbished in 1995 and a granite plaza was added in 2004.

The column was one of a series of monuments erected by Great Northern Railway between 1925 and 1926.

Details

The  column stands atop  Coxcomb Hill and includes an interior spiral staircase that leads to an observation deck at the top. Projected by Electus D. Litchfield and painted by Attilio Pusterla, the mural shows 14 significant events in the early history of Oregon, as well as 18 scenes from the history of the region, including Captain Gray's discovery of the Columbia River in 1792 and the Lewis and Clark Expedition. The frieze starts with the "pristine forest" and concludes with the arrival of the railway in Astoria.

A plaque near the column commemorates the pioneering Community Antenna Television (CATV) system built by local resident Leroy E. "Ed" Parsons, initially at the Hotel Astoria, in which twin-lead transmission wires redistributed the signal of KRSC-TV (now KING-TV) in Seattle, Washington to area homes. Former Astoria resident Byron Roman was also involved in early cable invention and distribution.

The cast-iron spiral staircase inside the column was closed for safety reasons in November 2007. It was reopened to the public in time for the Regatta in August 2009.

Images

See also

Other Great Northern memorials

 Verendrye, North Dakota
 Camp Disappointment (Meriwether), Montana
 Marias Pass (Summit), Montana
 Bonners Ferry, Idaho
 Wishram, Washington

References

External links
 
 
 

1920s murals
1926 establishments in Oregon
Buildings and structures completed in 1926
Buildings and structures in Astoria, Oregon
Cable television in the United States
Culture of Astoria, Oregon
Towers in Oregon
Monumental columns in the United States
Murals in Oregon
National Register of Historic Places in Astoria, Oregon
Tourist attractions in Clatsop County, Oregon
Great Northern Railway (U.S.)